Vilmundar saga viðutan is a medieval Icelandic romance saga. It is noted in recent scholarship as an early example of ATU 510A, 'Cinderella'.

Synopsis
Kalinke and Mitchell summarise the saga thus:
Gullbrá and Sóley are twin daughters of the king of Hólmgarðaríki. To avoid marrying the disagreeable Úlfr, Sóley promises to marry the ugly slave Kolr, but changes shapes with another woman. The able but naive Vilmundr, son of a man named Sviði, comes upon Gullbrá while seeking a lost goat. After winning a series of contests, Vilmundr becomes the sworn brother of Gullbrá's brother Hjarandi. They overcome various attackers, among them a herd of pigs. Vilmundr marries the real Sóley, Guðifreyr of Garðaríki marries Gullbrá, and Guðifrey's sister marries Hjarandi.

Editions and translations
 Agnete Loth (ed.), Late Medieval Icelandic Romances, Editiones Arnamagæanae, series B, 20–24, 5 vols (Copenhagen: Munksgaard, 1962–65), IV 137–201. [The principal scholarly edition.]
 Jonathan Y. H. Hui (ed. and trans.), Vilmundar saga viðutan: The saga of Vilmundr the Outsider (London: Viking Society for Northern Research, 2021), . [Normalised Icelandic text and English translation.]

References

Chivalric sagas
Icelandic literature
Old Norse literature
Cinderella
ATU 500-559